is a fictional anthropomorphic crocodile and the main antagonist in Nintendo's Donkey Kong video game franchise, as well as the archnemesis of Donkey Kong and Diddy Kong. K. Rool is the villainous leader of a group of crocodilian raiders known as the Kremlings, who have crossed paths with the Kongs on many occasions. First appearing in the 1994 video game Donkey Kong Country for the Super Nintendo Entertainment System, he has been described as being "to Donkey Kong what Bowser is to Mario". He is depicted as unstable, adopting different personae and titles and utilizing a variety of weapons to his advantage. K. Rool resembles an overweight crocodile with an infected, bulging eye. The name "K. Rool" is a play on the word "cruel", a reference to his malevolent nature. He also appeared as a playable character in Super Smash Bros. series. In addition to video games, K. Rool has appeared in the manga adaption of Donkey Kong Country, the Donkey Kong Country animated series, comics and several pieces of Nintendo merchandise.

In the Donkey Kong Country trilogy, its Game Boy Advance ports and Donkey Kong 64, K. Rool's voice was provided by former Rare developer Chris Sutherland. K. Rool was voiced by Japanese voice actor Toshihide Tsuchiya, who also provides the voice of Funky Kong.

Characteristics 

In his debut appearance, King K. Rool is depicted as a large obese crocodile with a red cape, golden wristbands, a golden belly plate, large crown and a large bloodshot eye. He was designed by Steve Mayles, an artist who worked at Rare and brother of Donkey Kong Country designer Gregg Mayles. In later appearances, K. Rool's attire changes depending on which persona he is masquerading as. His aliases include , Baron K. Roolenstein and King "Krusha" K. Rool. K. Rool has also been seen piloting a variety of vessels, including Gangplank Galleon, a large pirate ship in Donkey Kong Country, the Flying Krock, a steampunk inspired flying machine while in Donkey Kong Country 2: Diddy's Kong Quest and the Knautilus, a fish-shaped submarine that appeared in Donkey Kong Country 3: Dixie Kong's Double Trouble!.

From DK: King of Swing onward, K. Rool was redesigned with a more cartoony appearance with brighter green skin, a smaller and less bloodshot eye, no tail, a tan-colored underbelly and a smaller crown. This incarnation of K. Rool also makes an appearance in Mario Super Sluggers for the Wii, wearing Maya king attire and wielding a green sceptre. His overall design in Super Smash Bros. Ultimate is based on this appearance, but with elements taken from his previous design, such as his tail, golden belly plate and dark green skin.

K. Rool is described as being "demented" and "unbalanced" in his Super Smash Bros. Melee trophy description, citing his desire to blow up DK Isles in Donkey Kong 64. In a former Rareware.com scribes column, Gregg Mayles stated that K. Rool's motivation for stealing the banana hoard is that he wants Donkey Kong to starve to death so that he can occupy his "cosy treehouse pad" or perhaps that he simply likes bananas. The latter explanation is supported by the manual of the first game, but contradicted in DK: Jungle Climber, as K. Rool states that he hates bananas. When asked what the K in "K. Rool" stands for, Mayles said: "It was just a way of making him seem more important, that he'd added it to inflate his ego", joking that "it could have been something tonal like 'Kremling' or something deliberately out of character, like Keith".

Appearances

Main appearances

Donkey Kong Country 

King K. Rool appears in Donkey Kong Country as the final boss. Here he steals the Kongs' banana hoard and must be fought on his pirate ship, Gangplank Galleon. This ship later appears as the introduction stage of Donkey Kong Country 2, and again as a sunken ship in Donkey Kong 64. During this battle, K. Rool attempts to punish the Kongs by running into them, jumping on them from above, tossing his crown, and summoning a downpour of cannonballs, presumably from the ship's mast. Halfway through the battle, K. Rool feigns defeat, causing the game's "Kredits" to roll. This is an attempt to deceive the player, as he gets back up soon after and must be jumped on a few more times before the battle truly ends.

Donkey Kong Country 2 
In Donkey Kong Country 2, K. Rool is given the "Kaptain" moniker and kidnaps Donkey Kong. He wears a pirate costume resembling that of real pirates during the Elizabethan era, complete with a large, black bicorne hat, frock coat, and a blunderbuss as his weapon of choice. This disguise complements the pirate motif of Donkey Kong Country 2. The Kongs confront Kaptain K. Rool aboard the Flying Krock, a crocodile-shaped aircraft that hovers above Crocodile Isle. During this battle, they must avoid an onslaught of cannonballs and toxic gases that can either reverse the player's controls, slow them down, or briefly stun them. To damage K. Rool, the player must jam his blunderbuss with cannonballs while he uses the firearm's vacuum function. Twice during the battle, K. Rool falls unconscious as Donkey Kong tries to escape being tied up, only for K. Rool to revive and scare him away. The third time K. Rool collapses, DK finally wriggles free and sends him flying with a punch.

Kaptain K. Rool is fought a second time in Krocodile Kore, a volcano located in the Lost World of Crocodile Isle. To gain access to this level, players must collect every bonus token and present them to Klubba, a muscular Kremling who guards the Lost World, which is heavily implied to be the Kremlings' place of origin. After K. Rool is defeated once more, a cutscene takes place showing Crocodile Isle exploding against a sunset, with the Kong family observing K. Rool escape on a sailboat from a nearby cliff.

Donkey Kong Country 3 
Following the events of Donkey Kong Country 2, K. Rool goes into hiding due to the destruction of Crocodile Isle. This time he kidnaps both Donkey Kong and Diddy Kong, imprisons the Queen Banana Bird, and heads to the Northern Kremisphere. Here he resides in Kastle Kaos, and takes on the role of a helipack-wearing mad scientist, aptly named Baron K. Roolenstein. He tricks the heroes Dixie Kong and Kiddy Kong into believing that he has been defeated and KAOS—a Frankenstein-esque robot—is responsible for kidnapping the other Kongs. Once they reach the castle, they are shocked to learn that K. Rool has been the true mastermind behind the plot. He states that, "I'd have gotten away with it, if it weren't for you meddling kids", a reference to Scooby-Doo.

Baron K. Roolenstein is battled twice; first in Kastle Kaos, and again in the Knautilus, a submarine that is located in this game's hidden world, Krematoa. The name Krematoa is likely derived from the volcanic island Krakatoa. During both boss fights, K. Rool utilizes electricity and technology to torment the Kongs. After being defeated for a second time, K. Rool is chased around the North Kremisphere by the vengeful Queen Banana Bird.

Donkey Kong 64 
Rather than just kidnap the other Kongs and steal bananas, King K. Rool decides to take a more barbaric approach by planning to blow up Kong Isle with his "Blast-o-matic" laser. K. Rool wears his traditional King attire for the majority of the game, but in the final battle against the Kongs, he wears a boxing outfit under the ring name of King "Krusha" K. Rool and does battle with them in front of his Kremling subordinates. This final boss fight has five rounds due to there being five playable characters. Much like in his original appearance, K. Rool would get back up after being knocked out. After being distracted by Candy Kong in a brief cutscene, Funky Kong delivers the final blow to the Kremling King with a mechanical boot.

Other appearances

Video games 
In addition to his primary roles in Rare's Donkey Kong Country games, King K. Rool appears in Donkey Kong Land, Donkey Kong Land 2, Donkey Kong Land III. He also appears in several Donkey Kong games following Microsoft's acquisition of Rare in 2002, including Donkey Konga, DK: King of Swing, Donkey Kong Barrel Blast, and DK: Jungle Climber. K. Rool's first playable appearance outside of the Donkey Kong series was in Mario Super Sluggers. He is the strongest right-handed batter in the game, but has poor stamina and fielding. He shares good chemistry with Kritter and King Boo, and bad chemistry with the Kongs and Bowser.

K. Rool was planned to appear in Diddy Kong Pilot for the Game Boy Advance, which was later reworked into Banjo-Pilot due to Rare no longer having the authorization to use the Donkey Kong license. Leaked beta footage shows K. Rool wearing an aviator outfit.

In the Super Mario Odyssey level New Donk City, there are several street name signs that reference Donkey Kong characters, including K. Rool.

In the Super Smash Bros. series, K. Rool initially appeared as a collectible trophy in Super Smash Bros. Melee and every title since. In Super Smash Bros. for Nintendo 3DS and Wii U, an outfit bearing his resemblance was made available for download as a Mii fighter costume. He is a playable character in Super Smash Bros. Ultimate, becoming the third character representative for the Donkey Kong franchise. K. Rool's moves are based on his various appearances throughout the Donkey Kong series, including his crownerang from Donkey Kong Country, his belly flop from Donkey Kong Land, his blunderbuss from Donkey Kong Country 2, his propellerpack from Donkey Kong Country 3, his boxing gloves from Donkey Kong 64, and a Donkey Kong 64-inspired Final Smash that involves K. Rool firing his Blast-o-matic laser. In his weekly Famitsu column, series director Masahiro Sakurai stated that K. Rool was selected to join the roster because he "received a ton of votes" in the Smash Bros. Fighter Ballot.

K. Rool, along with Donkey Kong and Diddy Kong, are featured prominently in Banjo and Kazooie's Super Smash Bros. Ultimate reveal trailer, titled "Best Friends". This trailer continues where K. Rool's trailer left off, showing the Kremling King sleeping in Donkey Kong's treehouse alongside his nemeses. All three characters celebrate their reunion with Banjo and Kazooie, who have connections to the Donkey Kong universe via Diddy Kong Racing and Rare.

In other media 
King K. Rool appears as a main character in the Donkey Kong Country animated series, portrayed by Canadian theater actor Benedict Campbell, who gives him a formal British accent. In most episodes, K. Rool attempts to steal the Crystal Coconut, an ancient relic that is said to possess extraordinary power. This iteration of K. Rool has slimmer proportions, a shorter cape, and no tail. His left eye, while retaining the tic from the games, is no longer bloodshot. He is accompanied by his two Kremling henchmen, Klump and Krusha, who originally appeared in the Donkey Kong Country video game as generic enemies.

Reception
Since his debut in 1994, King K. Rool has received a mostly positive critical reception. K. Rool's appearance in Donkey Kong 64 was ranked number 85 on New York Magazine's list of '100 Hardest Video Game Bosses'. On her list of 'The Top 25 Most Powerful Nintendo Villains', Ashley Glenn of Comic Book Resources stated that K. Rool is not only "iconic", but "he's also one of the few villains that does something new every game we see him in".

In 2015, Game Revolution gave K. Rool the number two spot on their list of characters who deserve a spot in Super Smash Bros., arguing that "it's been far too long since we've seen the Kremlings get some proper representation, with the reptilian foes being conspicuously absent from both of Retro Studios' DKC titles. It's time, Nintendo. Bring back K. Rool!" Game Rant listed K. Rool at number eight on their list of the 'Top 10 Most Iconic Nintendo Villains': "We've been waiting patiently for K. Rool to pop up in one of Retro's Donkey Kong Country games, but at this point, we'd settle for a spot on the Super Smash Bros. roster instead". Playtonic Games, a development team containing many former Rare employees, campaigned for his inclusion as Super Smash Bros. for Nintendo 3DS and Wii U downloadable content. Additionally, many fan conducted polls had found King K. Rool to be a highly requested character in the Smash Bros. Fighter Ballot, an online survey Nintendo held to determine future DLC contenders. King K. Rool appeared as a playable character in Super Smash Bros Ultimate. His reveal was accompanied by a pre-rendered and gameplay trailer titled "The Rivals". Fans responded to K. Rool's inclusion in Super Smash Bros. Ultimate by sending series director Masahiro Sakurai a "thank you" letter. Jeremy Parish of Polygon ranked 73 fighters from Super Smash Bros. Ultimate "from garbage to glorious", listing King K. Rool as 58th. In 2018, Paste magazine writer Holly Green ranked King K. Rool as fourth of her favorite of the newcomers in Smash Bros. Ultimate. Gavin Jasper of Den of Geek ranked King K. Rool as 20th of Super Smash Bros. Ultimate characters, stating that "the character also makes for an imaginative contrast to the big, heavy villain types in Smash".

See also
 List of fictional crocodiles and alligators

References

Villains in animated television series
Anthropomorphic video game characters
Animal characters in video games
Donkey Kong characters
Fictional boxers
Fictional characters who can turn invisible
Fictional criminals in video games
Fictional crocodilians
Fictional gunfighters in video games
Fictional kidnappers
Male characters in video games
Male villains
Male video game villains
Fictional pirates in video games
Fictional scientists in video games
King characters in video games
Nintendo antagonists
Super Smash Bros. fighters
Video game bosses
Video game characters introduced in 1994
Video game characters who can move at superhuman speeds
Video game characters with superhuman strength